Hello Games Ltd is a British video game company based in Guildford, Surrey. The company was founded by Sean Murray, Grant Duncan, Ryan Doyle and David Ream in February 2008 and has developed the Joe Danger series, No Man's Sky, and The Last Campfire.

History 

Hello Games was founded in February 2008 by Sean Murray and Grant Duncan, together with friends Ryan Doyle and David Ream. Murray had been a developer at Electronic Arts prior and had grown tired of developing repeated sequels, and decided to leave to form his own studio to make a game he always wanted to make, Joe Danger, which was the studio's first release in 2010. At the 2010 Develop Awards, they won two awards: Best New Studio and Best Micro Studio. In September 2010, they were listed by The Guardian as one of the 100 most innovative and creative British companies of the previous 12 months. The popularity and success of Joe Danger led them to develop a sequel, Joe Danger 2: The Movie.

Murray said that coming back to do a sequel after having left Electronic Arts from doing sequels led to a mid-life crisis for himself, and gave rise for the idea of No Man's Sky, inspired by science fiction of the 1980s, with an entire universe of over 18 quintillion planets created through procedural generation. Developed by only a small four-person team led by Murray, No Man's Sky, was revealed at the VGX 2013 award show and generated a large amount of hype for the game. On 24 December 2013, the studio's offices were flooded after a nearby river broke its bank, with much of the hardware used in the development of the game being destroyed, but they were able to recover most of their projects' code and were able to relocate.

The media continued to build excitement for No Man's Sky, furthered by Sony Interactive Entertainment obtaining publishing rights for it on the PlayStation 4. However, the game was launched a few months late, and players found soon after launch many of the features in the game that had been seemingly promised in early media were absent such as multiplayer functions. Hello Games had also gone silent save for technical support. Hello Games was accused of dishonesty surrounding their promotion of the game, and the subsequent lack of promised features, but which Murray explained in later interviews that they failed to control the hype being generated by the media nor setting expectations for players of what the game would be like at launch and how they would develop it over time. Since launch, many of these missing features were added via numerous free post-release updates as well as new features including support for virtual reality and cross-platform play across multiple consoles, leading to the studio being praised for staying true to their vision of the game.

In 2017, the studio announced an initiative to fund multiple experimental and procedural generation projects based on their work in No Man's Sky called Hello Labs. At The Game Awards 2018, Hello Games announced The Last Campfire, a game developed by three employees, that was released in August 2020.

In September 2020, Murray said that while some of the staff were still working on continued updates for No Man's Sky, the remaining staff were working on a new game, but to avoid the issues around No Man's Skys launch hype, he planned to keep specifics of the game quiet until they are nearly ready to present it to the world. Murray said in April 2022 of the game, still in its early stages, "it's the kind of project that even if we had a thousand people working on it, it'd still seem impossible".

Games developed

References

External links 
 

Companies based in Guildford
British companies established in 2008
Video game companies established in 2008
Video game companies of the United Kingdom
Video game development companies
2008 establishments in England
Privately held companies of England